Gyeongju Korea Hydro & Nuclear Power FC or simply Gyeongju KHNP is a South Korean football team based in Gyeongju. They currently compete in the K3 League. They are run by Korea Hydro & Nuclear Power, and play their home games at Gyeongju Civic Stadium.

History 
The club was originally founded in 1945 and was dissolved during the Korean War. It was later refounded in 1962. They joined the Korea National League in 2003.

Honours

Domestic competitions

League
 K3 League
  Runners-up (1): 2020

 National League
 Winners (2): 2017, 2018
  Runners-up (4): 2010, 2013, 2015, 2019

Cups
 National League Championship
 Winners (3): 2008, 2014, 2019
 Runners-up (2): 2009, 2018
 National Sports Festival
 Gold Medal (1): 1967
 Silver Medal (1): 2009
 National Football Championship
 Winners (2): 1962, 1965
 Runners-up (4): 1964, 1967, 1980, 1982
 President's Cup
 Winners (1): 1962
 Runners-up (3): 1964, 1967, 1993

Season-by-season records

Current squad
As of 1 July 2022

See also
Gyeongju Korea Hydro & Nuclear Power WFC

References

External links
 Official website 

Korea National League clubs
Football clubs in North Gyeongsang Province
Association football clubs established in 1945
K3 League clubs
Works association football clubs in South Korea